Revolverlution is the eighth studio album by American hip hop group Public Enemy, released July 23, 2002 on Koch Records in the United States. The album debuted at number 110 on the U.S. Billboard 200 chart. Upon its release, it received generally positive reviews from most music critics, based on an aggregate score of 65/100 from Metacritic.

Reception

Rolling Stone (9/5/02, pp. 70,72) - 3 stars out of 5 - "The aural rummage sale brings some timely noise while proving D can still deliver lyrical knocks to the deserving."
Q (1/03, p. 123) - 3 stars out of 5 - "Bound to satisfy loyal fans."
Uncut (01/03, p. 126) - 3 stars out of 5 - "Brutally eloquent, anti-authority cyber-funk, PE are still fighting the powers that be."
Mojo (12/02, p. 122) - "Works very well indeed....Public Enemy are still making music of great substance and potency."
The Washington Post (9/13/02, p. 15) - "a marvel of snazzy production....musically speaking, the album never loses traction. Therefore, it is dismaying how much the lyrics muck things up....Chuck D. doesn't so much elucidate an issue as present topics of conversation, ladling out generous portions of ad hominem."

Track listing
"Gotta Give the Peeps What They Need" – 3:32
"Revolverlution" – 3:01
"Miuzi Weighs A Ton - Live San Francisco 10/21/1999" – 1:47
"Put It Up" – 3:11
"Can a Woman Make a Man Lose His Mind?" – 3:34
"Public Enemy Service Announcement #1" – 0:21
"Fight the Power - Live Winterthur Switzerland 1992" – 3:55
"By The Time I Get to Arizona (The Molemen Mixx)" – 3:57
"Post-Concert Arizona Interview (U2 Zoo Tour)" – 1:03
"Son of a Bush" – 5:52
"54321... Boom" – 3:37
"Welcome to the Terrordome - Live Winterthur Switzerland 1992" – 3:38
"B Side Wins Again (Scattershot Remix)" – 4:54
"Get Your Shit Together" – 4:47
"Public Enemy Service Announcement #2" – 0:30
"Shut 'Em Down (The Functionist Version)" – 5:28
"Now a' Daze" – 3:25
"Public Enemy #1 (Jeronimo Punx Redu)" – 4:48
"The Making of Burn Hollywood Burn (w/ Big Daddy Kane, Flavor Flav, Chuck D - 1989)" – 2:46
"Gotta Give The Peeps What They Need (DJ Johnny Juice - Paris Revolverlutionary Mix)" – 3:30
"What Good Is a Bomb" – 6:17

Bonus track
"Public Enemy #1 (Dimension Zero Remix)" - 6:12 (Bonus Track Japanese Release)

Personnel
Credits for Revolverlution adapted from Allmusic.

 The 7th Octave – bass, guitar, performer
 Johnny "Juice" Rosado - producer, engineer, mixing, scratches, remixing, musician
 C Doc – editing, mastering
 Michael Closter – executive producer
 Albie Cora – engineer, remixing, mixing
 Gary G-Wiz – producer, executive producer
 Randy Glaude – bass, guitar, musician
 Earle Holder – Mastering Engineer
 Walter Leapheart – executive producer
 William March – vocals (background)
 Mista Chuck – arranger

 Paul Mooney – vocals, introduction
 John Penn II – engineer
 Carl Ryder – executive producer
 Eddy Schreyer – mastering
 Kavon Shah – bass, guitar, musician
 Amani K. Smith – producer
 Ryan J-W Smith – remixing, drum programming
 Ryan Smith – drum programming
 Jeff Snyder – bass, guitar, remixing, drum programming
 Khari Wynn – musician

Chart history

References

External links
 Revolverlution at Discogs
 

2002 albums
Public Enemy (band) albums